Milanese (endonym in traditional orthography) is the central variety of the Western dialect of the Lombard language spoken in Milan, the rest of its metropolitan city, and the northernmost part of the province of Pavia. Milanese, due to the importance of Milan, the largest city in Lombardy, is considered one of the most prestigious Lombard variants and the most prestigious one in the Western Lombard area.

In Italian-language contexts, Milanese is often (like most things spoken in Italy other than standard Italian) called a "dialect" of Italian. However, linguistically, Lombard is a Western Romance language and is more closely related to French, Romansh, Occitan and to other Gallo-Italic languages than it is to standard Italian.

Milanese has an extensive literature, reaching as far back as the 13th century and including the works of important writers such as Bonvesin da la Riva (mid 13th century-1313), Carlo Maria Maggi (1630-1699) Carlo Porta (1775-1821). In addition to the large literary corpus, various dictionaries, a few grammar books and a recent translation of the Gospels are available in the language.

Distribution 

The Milanese dialect as commonly defined today is essentially concentrated around Milan and its metropolitan city, reaching into the northernmost part of the province of Pavia. Subdialects of Milanese - also known as dialètt arios - are spoken in the western part of the province (Castano Primo, Turbigo, Abbiategrasso, Magenta), the eastern part (Gorgonzola, Cassina de' Pecchi, Cernusco sul Naviglio, Segrate, Bellinzago), the parts to the north of the Naviglio Martesana (Carugate, Cassano d'Adda, Inzago, Gessate), certain areas where the dialect becomes transitional (between Saronno and Rho), the southern parts (Binasco and Melegnano), and the northern parts of the Province of Pavia (north of the line between Bereguardo and Landriano, which includes places such as Trovo and Casorate Primo).

Historically, up to the late 19th century, "Milanese" was also used to define the dialects spoken in Brianza and in the areas of Varese (Varesòtt) and Lecco (Lecches); less commonly it was also used to cover the whole Western Lombard dialect area, which had in Milanese its most prestigious variety.

Orthography 
As Milanese, like the Lombard language as a whole, is not an officially recognized language anywhere, there have been many different orthographic conventions, including pan-Lombard proposals (like the Scriver Lombard orthography), and conventions limited to Western Lombard (the Unified Insubric Orthography). The de facto standard for Milanese, though, is the literary classical Milanese orthography (Ortografia Milanesa Classega).

Classical Milanese orthography is the oldest orthographic convention still in use and it is the one used by all writers of Milanese literature, most famously by Carlo Porta. The trigraph  (sometimes written ), used to represent the  phoneme, is considered the most distinctive feature of this standard. Since the latter half of the 20th century, as a consequence of the Italianization of Lombardy with the Lombard language ceasing to be the main language of daily use in Milan, the Classical orthography has been contested and lost ground as Italian speakers often find it counterintuitive.

Example 

English

Our Father, Who art in heaven, Hallowed be Thy Name; Thy Kingdom come, Thy will be done, on earth as it is in heaven. Give us this day our daily bread, and forgive us our trespasses, as we forgive those who trespass against us; and lead us not into temptation, but deliver us from evil.

Milanese

Italian

Latin

See also 
 Carlo Porta
 Western Lombard language

References 
This article contains material translated from Italian Wikipedia's version of this page.

Western Lombard language
Culture in Milan